Breeden is an unincorporated community in Marlboro County, in the U.S. state of South Carolina.

History
The community was named after the Breeden family which owned several large farms in the area. Variant names are "Breeden Siding" and "Breedens".

References

Unincorporated communities in South Carolina
Unincorporated communities in Marlboro County, South Carolina